is a Japanese football player who plays for Nankatsu SC.

Club career
After the 2017 season, Sekiguchi seemed to have opted for retirement. With a surprise announcement, though, he joined back Vegalta Sendai in April 2018.

National team career
Sekiguchi made a full international debut for Japan on 8 October 2010 in a friendly against Argentina.

Club statistics

1Includes Relegation/Promotion Play-offs.

National team statistics

Honours

Japan
Kirin Cup (1) : 2011

Club
 Vegalta Sendai
J2 League (1) : 2009
 Cerezo Osaka
J.League Cup (1) : 2017
Emperor's Cup (1) : 2017

References

External links

Japan National Football Team Database

1985 births
Living people
People from Tama, Tokyo
Association football people from Tokyo Metropolis
Japanese footballers
Japan international footballers
J1 League players
J2 League players
Vegalta Sendai players
Urawa Red Diamonds players
Cerezo Osaka players
Nankatsu SC players
Association football midfielders